The Stadium at the ESPN Wide World of Sports is a baseball stadium located at the ESPN Wide World of Sports Complex in the Walt Disney World Resort. The stadium was built in 1997. It was most recently the home of the Rookie-league GCL Braves, until they moved to CoolToday Park in North Port.

The 7,500-seat stadium was designed by David M. Schwarz in a style the designer dubbed Florida Picturesque incorporating Venetian Gothic Revival, Mediterranean and Spanish influences with yellow-painted stucco, green-tile roofs, towers and arches.

Name
The Stadium at the ESPN Wide World of Sports was originally known as The Ballpark then Cracker Jack Stadium. When it was first built, Frito-Lay purchased the naming rights to the venue for ten years and put its Cracker Jack brand on the stadium. Frito-Lay chose not to renew its naming rights deal. During most of 2007, it was referred to as The Ballpark at Disney's Wide World of Sports. On November 1 of that year, HanesBrands Inc. purchased the naming rights for ten years and renamed it Champion Stadium.

History
Originally, Disney planned for no MLB permanent spring training tenant for the stadium, instead using as a Grapefruit League neutral site with rotating teams. However, the Braves organization became interested and moved in.

The Ballpark opened with the rest of Disney's Wide World of Sports Complex on March 28, 1997, with an exhibition baseball game between the Atlanta Braves and the Cincinnati Reds. The Gulf Coast League Braves began play at the stadium in 1997, while the Atlanta Braves started its 20-year spring training lease in 1998.

In 2000, after years of poor attendance at Tinker Field, the Orlando Rays moved to the Ballpark. However, the Rays, continued to draw barely 1,000 fans a game in their new stadium. Things improved somewhat over the next three seasons; the Rays drew 150,051 fans in 2003, more than twice what they had seen just a few years earlier at Tinker Field, but still last in the league. Following the 2003 season, the Rays moved (breaking a 10-year lease at Disney after just four years) and became the Montgomery Biscuits.

The venue hosted the 2001 Atlantic 10 Conference baseball tournament, won by Temple.

The old style manual score board was replaced in 2003 with a larger electronic scoreboard and message center. Champion Stadium was used during first-round games for the 2006 World Baseball Classic. It hosted Pool D, and featured teams with professional players from Venezuela, Australia, Dominican Republic and Italy.

The stadium hosted its first regular season MLB games from May 15 through 17, 2007 season when the Texas Rangers played the Tampa Bay Devil Rays in a three-game series. The three games drew a total of 26,917 fans, and attendance went up each game. In April 2008, the Rays moved another series, this time against the Toronto Blue Jays, to Orlando.

In January 2017, the Braves announced a formal agreement to move their spring training home to CoolToday Park in North Port, Florida, which opened in 2019.

References

External links
 Champion Stadium Official Website
 Atlanta Braves Spring training info
 Photos and review on ballparkwatch.com
 Champion Stadium Views – Ball Parks of the Minor Leagues

Minor league baseball venues
Grapefruit League venues
Sports venues in Orlando, Florida
World Baseball Classic venues
Spring training ballparks
Walt Disney World
Tampa Bay Rays stadiums
Baseball venues in Florida
Atlanta Braves spring training venues
Frito-Lay
Sports venues completed in 1997
1997 establishments in Florida
Florida Complex League ballparks
Olympic stadiums
United States